is a district located in Fukushima Prefecture, Japan.

As of 2010, the district has a population of 72,822, which fell to 7,338 in 2015, and a density of 8.5 persons per km2. The total area is 865.12 km2.

Towns and villages
Futaba
Hirono
Namie
Naraha
Ōkuma
Tomioka
Katsurao
Kawauchi

See also
Fukushima Daiichi nuclear disaster

References

Districts in Fukushima Prefecture